The Cloud State Bank, also known as the People's National Bank, is located in McLeansboro, Hamilton County, Illinois. The bank building was designed and built from 1880-1882 by Aaron G. Cloud and his son Chalon Cloud. The Cloud State Bank has been on the National Register of Historic Places since 1978. The building was designed by architects the Reid Brothers of Evansville, Indiana. The Reid Brothers would go on to famously design the Hotel del Coronado near San Diego.

Notes

Bank buildings on the National Register of Historic Places in Illinois
Buildings and structures in Hamilton County, Illinois
National Register of Historic Places in Hamilton County, Illinois
Commercial buildings completed in 1882
Reid & Reid buildings